The 1908 Georgia Bulldogs football team represented the Georgia Bulldogs of the University of Georgia during the 1908 Southern Intercollegiate Athletic Association football season. The Bulldogs completed the season with a 5–2–1 record.  Georgia had victories against Clemson and South Carolina, but lost to one of its main rivals, Auburn. This was the team's first and only season under the guidance of head coach Branch Bocock, although he had coached three games in 1907 for head coach Bull Whitney.  One of the players on the 1908 team was quarterback George "Kid" Woodruff.  After a successful season, Woodruff traveled abroad in 1909 and returned to the university in 1910 and 1911 and eventually became the head coach of the Bulldogs in 1923.

The game against Alabama on November 14, 1908 was the 100th game played by the football team since starting in 1892.  Georgia tied Alabama in that game, bringing Georgia's record in the first 100 games to 45–47–8, .490 winning percentage.

Schedule

Sources

References

Georgia
Georgia Bulldogs football seasons
Georgia Bulldogs football